Justice C. V. K. Abdul Rehim (born 2 May 1958) is an Indian judge. He is former Judge of Kerala High Court.

Justice Rehim is known for his historic judgements. During the year 2019 he served as the Acting Chief Justice of Kerala High Court.

Career
He was appointed as Judge of Kerala High Court on 5 January 2009. He has also served as Acting Chief Justice of Kerala High Court. He was retired on 1 May 2020.

References 

 

Indian judges
1958 births
Living people